Kopu is a settlement in on the Coromandel Peninsula in New Zealand's North Island. It is located near Thames, in the Thames-Coromandel District in the Waikato region.

Kopu is located on the Waihou River and features the Kopu Bridge.

The Totora-Kopu statistical area, as defined by Statistics New Zealand, covers a land area of 8.39 km².

Demography

Totora-Kopu had a population of 867 at the 2018 New Zealand census, an increase of 90 people (11.6%) since the 2013 census, and an increase of 183 people (26.8%) since the 2006 census. There were 333 households, comprising 432 males and 435 females, giving a sex ratio of 0.99 males per female. The median age was 48.2 years (compared with 37.4 years nationally), with 153 people (17.6%) aged under 15 years, 123 (14.2%) aged 15 to 29, 369 (42.6%) aged 30 to 64, and 225 (26.0%) aged 65 or older.

Ethnicities were 84.4% European/Pākehā, 19.0% Māori, 1.7% Pacific peoples, 6.2% Asian, and 1.4% other ethnicities. People may identify with more than one ethnicity.

The percentage of people born overseas was 15.9, compared with 27.1% nationally.

Although some people chose not to answer the census's question about religious affiliation, 46.4% had no religion, 39.4% were Christian, 0.3% had Māori religious beliefs, 1.4% were Hindu, 0.3% were Muslim, 2.1% were Buddhist and 2.1% had other religions.

Of those at least 15 years old, 102 (14.3%) people had a bachelor's or higher degree, and 156 (21.8%) people had no formal qualifications. The median income was $29,300, compared with $31,800 nationally. 114 people (16.0%) earned over $70,000 compared to 17.2% nationally. The employment status of those at least 15 was that 315 (44.1%) people were employed full-time, 114 (16.0%) were part-time, and 18 (2.5%) were unemployed.

Economy

In 2018, 13.9% of the workforce worked in manufacturing, 13.2% worked in construction, 9.0% worked in healthcare, 6.3% worked in hospitality, 6.3% worked in education, 3.5% worked in transport and 1.4% of the workforce worked in primary industries.

Transportation

As of 2018, among those who commuted to work, 75.7% drove a car, 4.9% rode in a car, and 1.4% walked, ran or cycled.

References

Populated places in Waikato
Thames-Coromandel District